Trutovsky is a Russian and Ukrainian surname. Notable people with the surname include:

 Kostyantyn Trutovsky (1826–1893), Russian-Ukrainian painter
 Vasily Fyodorovich Trutovsky (1740–1810), Ukrainian folk-song collector and composer

See also
 

Russian-language surnames
Ukrainian-language surnames